Yelena Nicolaevna Trofimenko (born March 20, 1964) is a Belarusian film director, producer, screenwriter, author, actress and poet.

Biography 
Trofimenko was born on 20 March 1964 in Minsk, Belarus. In 1996, she became a director at the Belarusfilm studio. In 1998, her first full-length film Falling Upward, was released.

In 1996, Trofimenko became a member of the Belarusian Union of Cinematographers and, in 1998, a member of board of directors. She is a founder, originator and artistic director of the creative studio Youth Studio XXI (Belarusfilm, 2002). Festival of one film was created at this studio.

In 2012, Trofimenko created a collection of poems and reproductions, The Book.

Filmography

Performances

References

External links
 Yelena Trofimenko in Film Theatre
 Yelena Trofimenko in Belarusfilm
 "The Book" by Yelena Trofimenko (2012)

1964 births
Living people
Belarusian film actresses
Belarusian film directors
Belarusian women film directors
20th-century Belarusian poets
Belarusian screenwriters
20th-century Belarusian actresses
21st-century Belarusian actresses
21st-century Belarusian poets
Belarusian women poets
20th-century women writers
21st-century women writers
Belarusian State Academy of Arts alumni